American actor Bruce Willis began his career in 1980 with an uncredited role in The First Deadly Sin. After guest-starring in a 1984 episode of Miami Vice, he appeared in the first episode of the 1985 revival of The Twilight Zone. Willis achieved fame starring in the ABC comedy-drama series Moonlighting (1985–1989), for which he received three Golden Globe nominations for Best Actor – Television Series Musical or Comedy and two Primetime Emmy Award nominations for Outstanding Lead Actor in a Drama Series. In 1988, he starred as John McClane in Die Hard (1988), a film that spawned four sequels that earned him international recognition as an action hero.

In the following years, Willis lent his voice for the video game Apocalypse (1998), the comedy film Look Who's Talking (1989), and its sequel Look Who's Talking Too (1990). In 1991, he conceived the story for Hudson Hawk, starred as Bo Weinberg in Billy Bathgate, and appeared in The Last Boy Scout alongside Damon Wayans, which earned a cult following and a nomination for the MTV Movie Award for Best On-Screen Duo. Willis' additional credits include Pulp Fiction (1994), 12 Monkeys (1995), Last Man Standing (1996), The Fifth Element (1997), and Armageddon (1998). In 1999, he starred as Dr. Malcolm Crowe in the critically acclaimed The Sixth Sense (1999), which earned six Academy Award nominations. His guest appearance on Friends in 2000 earned his third Emmy nomination, this time for Outstanding Guest Actor in a Comedy Series. After appearing in Sin City (2005) and voicing the lead character in the animated film Over the Hedge (2006), he starred in Red and made a cameo appearance in The Expendables (both 2010).

By the 2010s, Willis began starring in straight-to-video films that have received mostly negative reviews from critics and moviegoers. From The New York Times, Elisabeth Vincentelli analyzed several of his films and found that they generally lacked substance, with action sequences replacing "any attempts at coming up with decent plots", and featured Willis for an average of 15 minutes. Willis has also starred in the 2012 films Moonrise Kingdom, The Expendables 2, and Looper. In 2013, he made an appearance as the title character in G.I. Joe: Retaliation and hosted Saturday Night Live. Willis is also known for collaborating with writer and director M. Night Shyamalan in several of his films including the Eastrail 177 Trilogy consisting of Unbreakable (2000), Split (2016), and Glass (2019). In March 2022, Willis' family announced he was retiring from acting after he was diagnosed with frontotemporal dementia. By the end of his career, the films he starred in had grossed over US$5 billion worldwide, making him one of the highest-grossing actors in the world.

Film

Television

Broadway

Other media

See also
 List of awards and nominations received by Bruce Willis

References

External links
 
 

American filmographies
Filmography
Male actor filmographies